Benton, Pennsylvania may refer to:

Benton, Columbia County, Pennsylvania
Benton, Lancaster County, Pennsylvania